Linda Arkley  is a British Conservative politician who served as the elected Mayor of North Tyneside from 2003 to 2005 and from 2009 to 2013.

Early life 
Arkley attended The Bede School in Sunderland, and studied at both Sunderland University and Northumbria University. For most of Arkley's professional career she worked as a nurse and health visitor.

Political career 
Arkley was first elected as a councillor for Tynemouth ward in 1991, a seat she held until 1995 before regaining it in 1996. During this time she served as deputy leader of the Conservative group on North Tyneside council and in cabinet under Conservative Mayor, Chris Morgan.

The Conservative Mayor of North Tyneside, Chris Morgan, resigned in 2003 due to a scandal involving child pornography. Arkley stood in the subsequent by-election, and won in the second round defeating then MEP Gordon Adam.

She was defeated in 2005 by Labour candidate John Harrison.

Later that year she stood in a council by-election in 2005, and was elected to represent Preston ward.

Arkley regained the mayoralty of North Tyneside in 2009, when she defeated Harrison. Towards the end of Arkley's second term she was expelled from a meeting of North Tyneside Council after she “berated” Labour councillor Sandra Graham after she asked questions about workers’ rights and the safeguarding of external funding.

In May 2013 she was defeated by the Labour candidate Norma Redfearn.

Arkley stood as the Conservative candidate for Tynemouth ward in 2014, when she was defeated by the Labour incumbent, Sarah Day. In the 2015 local elections, Linda Arkley again unsuccessfully attempted to return to North Tyneside Council by standing in Benton ward where she lost to Labour's Janet Hunter.

In March 2019, Linda Arkley announced her intention to seek the Conservative nomination in the inaugural North of Tyne Mayoral election, noting that she was the only declared female candidate for the office. Having chosen the International Women's Day to announce her decision, she has told ChronicleLife that her candidacy has been inspired by "making sure this isn't a male dominated race." Arkley would go on to lose the nomination to local businessman Charlie Hoult.

Arkley made her return to North Tyneside Council in 2021, taking the seat of Cullercoats ward from the Labour Party in that years local elections.

Honours 
Arkley was made an Order of the British Empire in 2018 for political service.

References

External links 
Councillor Linda Arkley page at North Tyneside Council.

Mayors of the Metropolitan Borough of North Tyneside
Conservative Party (UK) politicians
Women mayors of places in England
Living people
Officers of the Order of the British Empire
Year of birth missing (living people)
Conservative Party (UK) mayors
21st-century British politicians
21st-century British women politicians
21st-century English women
21st-century English people